More Pep is a 1936 Fleischer Studios animated short film starring Betty Boop, and featuring Pudgy the Puppy.

Synopsis
"Uncle Max" (Max Fleischer) draws Betty and Pudgy out of the inkwell. Pudgy is tired and unwilling to perform on Betty's command. Betty uses pen and ink to draw a machine that gives Pudgy more pep. The machine soon runs amok when she puts too many ingredients into the machine, speeding up not only Betty and Pudgy, but the entire city as well, including the man, the parade, the traffic (cars, trucks, vans, pickup trucks, flatbed trucks etc.) and in the house, the wallclock and the painting hang on the wall.

References

External links
 More Pep at the Big Cartoon Database.
 More Pep on YouTube.
 More Pep at IMDb.

1936 short films
Betty Boop cartoons
1930s American animated films
American black-and-white films
1936 animated films
Paramount Pictures short films
Fleischer Studios short films
Short films directed by Dave Fleischer
Animated films about dogs
1930s English-language films
American comedy short films
American animated short films
Self-reflexive films
Films about animation